Ralph & Katie is a BBC television drama series, a spin-off of The A Word, about the lives of a couple with Down syndrome. The six-part series, handled by a writing team made up predominantly of people with disabilities, began broadcast in October 2022. Disney+ picked up the programme across all of Europe, except the UK.

Cast
 Leon Harrop as Ralph
 Sarah Gordy as Katie
 Pooky Quesnel as Louise, Ralph's mother
 Dylan Brady as Danny
 Craig Cash as Brian
 Matt Greenwood as Tom
 Sam Retford as Gary

Production
In August 2020 it was announced that a spin-off series, following the married life of characters from The A Word, had been commissioned by the BBC.

Episodes

Reception
Jack Seale of The Guardian awarded the first two episodes four stars out of five, praising the humour, warmth and characters. Anita Singh in The Telegraph also gave it four stars out of five.

References

External links
 

2022 British television series debuts
2020s British drama television series
British television spin-offs
BBC television dramas
English-language television shows
Down syndrome in television
Television series about couples
Television series by ITV Studios
Television series by Tiger Aspect Productions